San Luis National Forest was established by the U.S. Forest Service in California on July 1, 1908 from part of San Luis Obispo National Forest with . On July 1, 1910 the entire forest was combined with Santa Barbara National Forest and the name was discontinued.

References

External links
Forest History Society
Listing of the National Forests of the United States and Their Dates (from the Forest History Society website) Text from Davis, Richard C., ed. Encyclopedia of American Forest and Conservation History. New York: Macmillan Publishing Company for the Forest History Society, 1983. Vol. II, pp. 743-788.

Los Padres National Forest
Former National Forests of California
Protected areas established in 1908
Protected areas disestablished in the 1910s
1908 establishments in California
1910 disestablishments in California